Newport GAA is a Tipperary GAA club which is located in County Tipperary, Ireland. Both hurling and Gaelic football are played in the "North Tipperary" divisional competitions. The club is centred on the town of Newport.

Lacken Park
Named after Paddy Ryan Lacken, and known locally as "The Park". It has four changing rooms (Home on right). With a club house at the end with many Newport GAA memorabilia as well as a kitchen a Referee's room while a meeting room also in the building. There are three pitches, a main pitch with a stand and great floodlight facilities. Separating the two Juvenile pitches and the main pitch is a hurling wall. The Juvenile pitch is very well designed with "The Hill" behind the far goal where the younger supporters watch on from. The Juvenile pitch is also floodlit, while the even younger teams (U8-10) play in a junior pitch with smaller goals and a shorter pitch. The U8-10s train in the GYM in the winter beside St. Mary's Secondary School. While the rest train in the Ball Alleys beside Newport College (Vocational School) in Newport, while the pitch is unplayable.

Achievements

Adult Titles

Hurling 
North Tipperary Senior Hurling Championship (3) 1932, 1935, 1996
Tipperary Intermediate Hurling Championship (3) 1989, 2002, 2016
 North Tipperary Intermediate Hurling Championship (8) 1934, 1957, 1965, 1988, 1989, 2009, 2014, 2015
 Tipperary Junior A Hurling Championship (1) 1957
 North Tipperary Junior A Hurling Championship (1) 1924
 North Tipperary Junior B Hurling Championship (2) 2011, 2015, 2017

Football 
 North Tipperary Senior Football Championship (4) 1986, 1987, 1988, 1990
 North Tipperary Intermediate Football Championship (9) 1979, 1985, 1993, 1995, 2001, 2002, 2005, 2006, 2009
 Tipperary Junior A Football Championship (2) 1965, 1970
 North Tipperary Junior A Football Championship (6) 1967, 1970, 1976, 1978, 1979, 2015
 North Tipperary Junior B Football Championship (1) 1996

Juvenile Titles

Hurling 
 Tipperary Under-21 B Hurling Championship (1) 2003
 North Tipperary Under-21 B Hurling Championship (2) 2003, 2004 (as Newport Gaels), 2018
 Tipperary Under-21 C Hurling Championship (1) 2001
 North Tipperary Minor A Hurling Championship (1) 2014 (as Newport Gaels)
 North Tipperary Minor B Hurling Championship (1) 1994

Football 
 North Tipperary Under-21 A Football Championship (7) 1985, 1986, 1996, 1997, 2005, 2010, 2015 (as Newport Gaels)
 North Tipperary Under-21 B Football Championship (2) 1990, 2008, 2018
 Tipperary Minor A Football Championship (2) 1995, 2001
 North Tipperary Minor A Football Championship (5) 1995, 2001, 2002, 2013 (as Newport Gaels), 2015 (as Newport Gaels)
 North Tipperary Minor B Football Championship (1) 1988

Notable players
 Jimmy Coffey
 Noel O'Gorman
 Conor O'Mahony - The Newport captain in 2008 became the 1st Newport man to win an All-Star. In early 2009 Conor was named as Tipperary vice Captain.
 Séamus Shinnors
 Dan Troy
 Sean O’Brien

Other noted figures
 Tim Floyd

References

External links 
Tipperary GAA site
Official Newport GAA Club website

Gaelic games clubs in County Tipperary
Hurling clubs in County Tipperary
Gaelic football clubs in County Tipperary